The 2012–13 Eerste Klasse season was the third edition of the Dutch fifth tier since the Topklasse was formed as the third tier in 2010. 

A total of 84 teams participated in the league. As usual, the competition is divided into eleven divisions: five divisions played on Saturdays and six divisions played on Sunday. 

The champion of each division was directly promoted to the 2013–14 Hoofdklasse. Saturday Champions were:
 SDV Barneveld
 Deltasport
 SV Oranje Wit
 AZSV
 Drachtster Boys
Sunday champions were:
 ASV De Dijk
 VOC Rotterdam
 VV De Valk
 RKSV Bekkerveld
 VV Alverna
 FVC Leeuwarden

References 

 Eerste Klasse 2012/13

Eerste Klasse seasons
Neth
5